Willy Favre (September 24, 1943 – December 19, 1986) is a Swiss former alpine skier and Olympic medalist. He was born in Les Diablerets. He received a silver medal in the giant slalom at the 1968 Winter Olympics in Grenoble. He also competed at the 1964 Winter Olympics.

References

1943 births
1986 deaths
Swiss male alpine skiers
Olympic alpine skiers of Switzerland
Olympic silver medalists for Switzerland
Alpine skiers at the 1964 Winter Olympics
Alpine skiers at the 1968 Winter Olympics
Olympic medalists in alpine skiing
Medalists at the 1968 Winter Olympics